Héctor Rueda Hernández (November 9, 1920 – November 1, 2011) was a Colombian prelate of the Roman Catholic Church.

Biography
Rueda Hernández was born in Colombia and ordained a priest on December 15, 1946. Rueda Hernández was appointed the bishop of the Archdiocese of Bucaramanga on May 5, 1960 and consecrated on June 19, 1960. On December 14, 1974, Rueda Hernández was appointed archbishop of the Archdiocese of Bucaramanga and would remain in the diocese until he was appointed archbishop of the Archdiocese of Medellín on November 7, 1991.  Rueda Hernández retired from the Archdiocese of Medellin on February 13, 1997.

See also

References

External links
Catholic-Hierarchy
 Archdiocese of Medellin (Spanish)

1920 births
2011 deaths
20th-century Roman Catholic archbishops in Colombia
Participants in the Second Vatican Council
People from Medellín
Major Seminary of Bogotá alumni
Roman Catholic bishops of Bucaramanga
Roman Catholic archbishops of Bucaramanga
Roman Catholic archbishops of Medellín